St. Lola in the Fields (a.k.a. St. Lola) is a two-person band based in Nashville, Tennessee. Band members include singer/songwriter/musician/author, Cindy Morgan Brouwer, and songwriter/producer/engineer/musician, Jeremy Bose.  St. Lola was birthed out of the need for both artists to have a venue to release their own penned songs that may have been viewed as having little commercial potential for other artists. The band members have together written over 20 number one songs, and have written songs for other artists, including Uncle Kracker and Clay Aiken, among others.

Morgan and Bose have collaborated on songwriting for over a decade and began work on St. Lola's first EP, Little Breaks/Little Bends, in 2007.  The EP, released in 2008, contains the following tracks:

Sunny
Happy
He’s In Love
Don’t Say
Oil and Water
Fix

The duo’s first full-length album, High Atop the Houses and the Towns, was released October 5, 2010. Containing 11 tracks in total, all tracks from their original EP were included on the full-length recording, except for the tracks Happy and Oil and Water. The group's first full-length album has a sound that may be described as piano based alternative pop with a moody electro ambiance to it.  Virtually all songs on the album deal with relationships and people, some with a positive outlook and several with a more somber view.

The album's first single, "Hold Me", was featured on an episode of Pretty Little Liars, airing on ABC Family.  The B-side of the single, "Don't Say", had previously been aired on the television series One Tree Hill, on The WB Television Network.

The band is currently on the Nettwerk Records label. Brouwer, who has sold millions of albums as a Contemporary Christian Music artist, continues to release music in the CCM genre as a solo artist under the name of Cindy Morgan (her maiden name).

Discography
EPs
 Little Breaks/Little Bends (2008)

Full-length albums
 High Atop the Houses and the Towns (2010)

References

External links
 

Musical groups from Nashville, Tennessee